"Lonely" is a song by South Korean girl group 2NE1, serving as one of the lead singles from their 2011 self-titled second EP. The single was written and produced by Teddy Park and was released via digital download and streaming on May 12, 2011 by YG Entertainment. The song was a commercial success, peaking at number 1 on the Gaon Digital Chart in addition to topping all of the South Korean real-time digital charts following its release, achieving a perfect all-kill.

A Japanese version of the song was released digitally on September 14, 2011 through YGEX, and was included in the Japanese edition of the extended play, titled Nolza.

Background
The song was written and produced by the group's long-time collaborator and in-house YG Entertainment producer Teddy Park. Musically, the song is composed in the key of E major with a moderate tempo of 95 beats per minute, and has a runtime of 3:29. The instrumentals incorporates only stringed instruments, which include the guitar, cello, and violin and emphasizes the group's vocals. According to the CEO of YG Entertainment, Yang Hyun Suk, "2NE1’s new song counter feeds the people with an analogue sound unlike the majority who used strong electronics and house music and maybe that is why Will.i.am have [sic] found it interesting".

Commercial performance
The single was a commercial success, immediately topping all of South Korean real-time digital charts following its release and achieved a perfect all-kill, making it the first song to achieve a perfect all-kill by a K-pop girl group since the concept's inception in 2010. During its debut week on the Gaon Digital Chart, the single placed at number two and sold 432,701 digital units. The following week, the song took the number one position, becoming the group's third number one single and sold an additional 465,735 units. "Lonely" was subsequently ranked number one of both the Gaon digital and download charts for the month of May, having accumulated an estimated 1,477,729 units in digital sales.

By the end of the year, "Lonely" became one of the best performing song's in the country, selling more than 2.9 million digital units and garnering over 23.3 million streams, and ranked at number four on the year-end Gaon Digital Chart for 2011.

Music video and promotion
The Korean music video for "Lonely" was filmed on April 27, 2011 and was directed by Han Sa-min, who had previously directed the music video for Big Bang's fourth mini-special album's title song, "Love Song". The first teaser for "Lonely" was released on May 10 and featured CL and Minzy, and was followed by teasers featuring and Dara and Bom on May 11. The music video was uploaded to their official YouTube channel the next day. The cost of the outfits that 2NE1 featured in the music video, which consisted mostly of luxury brand Balmain, reportedly cost around US$200,000. In comparison, the production cost of the video itself was only about $150,000, making the members' outfits more expensive than the video itself.

A new Japanese edition of the music video was released on September 21 by YGEX along with the release of Nolza. The song was not extensively promoted on music programs; but on May 29, 2NE1 made a surprise two-part performance on SBS's Inkigayo with "Lonely" and Bom's solo single "Don't Cry". The appearance was made due to the overwhelming popularity of the two songs and was done as a gift to their fans. They later won a mutizen award for "Lonely".

Track listing
Digital download / streaming
"Lonely" – 3:29

Accolades

Chart performance

Weekly charts

Year-end charts

Sales

Release history

References

External links
 

2NE1 songs
2011 singles
Korean-language songs
YG Entertainment singles
Gaon Digital Chart number-one singles